Alexandra Hughes Techet is an American mechanical and marine engineer whose work involves experimental and image-based studies of hydrodynamics. She is a professor of mechanical and ocean engineering at the Massachusetts Institute of Technology department of mechanical engineering.

Education and career
Techet grew up as a sailor and diver in coastal North Carolina.
She studied mechanical and aerospace engineering at Princeton University, graduating in 1995. She then studied oceanographic engineering through a joint graduate program between the Massachusetts Institute of Technology and Woods Hole Oceanographic Institution, earning a master's degree in 1998 and completing her Ph.D. in 2001.

After postdoctoral research at Princeton, she returned to MIT as Doherty Assistant Professor of Ocean Utilization in the department of ocean engineering. In 2005 she became an assistant professor of mechanical engineering, as part of a broader merger of MIT's ocean engineering and mechanical engineering departments. She was promoted to full professor in 2019.

Contributions
Techet's research contributions include a study of the ability of archerfish to jump out of water in search of prey, and high-speed video capture of sneezes.

During the COVID-19 lockdown, she has also been active in providing home gardening advice to the MIT community through the MIT Office of Sustainability.

Recognition
Techet was named a fellow of the American Society of Mechanical Engineers in 2018.

References

External links
Home page

Year of birth missing (living people)
Living people
American marine engineers
American mechanical engineers
American women engineers
Princeton University alumni
Massachusetts Institute of Technology alumni
MIT School of Engineering faculty
Fellows of the American Society of Mechanical Engineers
American women academics
21st-century American women